Gronocarus autumnalis, the lobed spiny burrowing beetle, is a species of scarab beetle in the family Scarabaeidae. It is found in North America.

References

Further reading

 

Melolonthinae
Articles created by Qbugbot
Beetles described in 1927
Taxa named by Charles Frederic August Schaeffer